Aa is a populated place in the South Sulawesi province of Indonesia.

References

Populated places in South Sulawesi